Wilhelm "Willy" Köstinger (14 December 1940 in Innsbruck - 7 January 2014 in Seefeld in Tirol) was an Austrian Nordic combined skier who competed in the early 1960s. He is best known for his sixth place in the Nordic combined event at the 1962 FIS Nordic World Ski Championships in Zakopane. Köstinger also finished tenth in the Nordic combined event at the 1964 Winter Olympics in Innsbruck. Twelve years later, he took the Judge's Oath at the 1976 Winter Olympics, also held in Innsbruck.

References
1964 Nordic combined individual results
FIS profile
IOC 1976 Winter Olympics
Willy Köstinger's profile at Sports Reference.com
Willy Köstinger's obituary 

1940 births
2014 deaths
Austrian male Nordic combined skiers
Austrian male ski jumpers
Nordic combined skiers at the 1964 Winter Olympics
Olympic Nordic combined skiers of Austria
Olympic officials
Oath takers at the Olympic Games
Sportspeople from Innsbruck
20th-century Austrian people